Norm, the Norm or NORM may refer to:

In academic disciplines 
 Norm (geology), an estimate of the idealised mineral content of a rock 
 Norm (philosophy), a standard in normative ethics that is prescriptive rather than a descriptive or explanatory abstraction
 Social norm, expected patterns of behavior and belief
 Basic norm, a jurisprudence concept by Kelsen
 Peremptory norm, a fundamental principle of international law
 Norm (artificial intelligence), a set of statements used to regulate artificial intelligence software 
 Norm, a statistical concept in psychometrics representing the aggregate responses of a standardized and representative group
 NORM, naturally occurring radioactive materials
 NORM (non-mobile older rural males), an acronym in dialect studies coined by Chambers and Trudgill (1980) for a group to which speakers frequently refer

In mathematics 
 Norm (mathematics), a map that assigns a length or size to a mathematical object, including:
 Vector norm, a map that assigns a length or size to any vector in a vector space
 Matrix norm, a map that assigns a length or size to a matrix
 Operator norm, a map that assigns a length or size to any operator in a function space
 Norm (abelian group), a map that assigns a length or size to any element of an abelian group
 Field norm a map in algebraic number theory and Galois theory that generalizes the usual distance norm
 Ideal norm, the ideal-theoretic generalization of the field norm
 Norm (group), a certain subgroup of a group 
 Norm (map), a map from a pointset into the ordinals inducing a prewellordering
 Norm group, a group in class field theory that is the image of the multiplicative group of a field
 Norm function, a term in the study of Euclidean domains, sometimes used in place of "Euclidean function"

People 
 Norm (given name)
 Norm Macdonald, a Canadian stand-up comedian

Arts and entertainment 
 Norm Peterson, a character in the sitcom Cheers and its spin-off Frasier
 Norm, a recurring character in Phineas and Ferb
 The Norm (comic strip), syndicated by Michael Jantze
 The Norm (radio), a former CBC radio show
 The Norm, a character in the 1989 film Spirits of the Air, Gremlins of the Clouds
 Norm, the main character in the Norm of the North films
Norm (album), a 2023 album by Andy Shauf

Other uses 
 National Organization of Russian Muslims, a religious organization based in Russia
 Norm (chess), a chess result required to qualify for an official title 
 NORM (NACK-Oriented Reliable Multicast), a transport protocol
 Norm, a character from the Australian government physical fitness program and advertising campaign "Life. Be in it."
 Norms Restaurants, a chain of restaurants in Southern California

See also 
 The Norm Show, a television series featuring Norm Macdonald
 Norman (disambiguation)
 Normal (disambiguation)
 Norma (disambiguation)
 Technical standard

eo:Normo